The flag of Kazakhstan or Kazakh flag was adopted on 4 June 1992, replacing the flag of the Kazakh Soviet Socialist Republic. The flag was designed by Shaken Niyazbekov.

Description
The national flag of the Republic of Kazakhstan has a gold sun with 32 rays above a soaring golden steppe eagle, both centered on a turquoise background; the hoist side displays a national ornamental pattern called "koshkar-muiz" (the horns of the ram) in gold; the blue colour is of religious significance to the Turkic peoples of the country, and so symbolises cultural and ethnic unity; it also represents the endless sky as well as water; the sun, a source of life and energy, exemplifies wealth and plenitude; the sun's rays are shaped like grain, which is the basis of abundance and prosperity; the eagle has appeared on the flags of Kazakh tribes for centuries and represents freedom, power, and the flight to the future. The width of the flag to its length is 1:2.

Symbolism
The gold and turquoise colours were inherited from the former Soviet flag which were the gold from the hammer and sickle and the turquoise bar from the bottom of the flag. The pattern represents the art and cultural traditions of the old Khanate and the Kazakh people. The turquoise background symbolises the peace, freedom, cultural, and ethnic unity of Kazakh people including the various Turkic people that make up the present-day population such as the Kazakhs, Tatars, Uyghurs, Uzbeks, as well as the significant Indo-European peoples. The sun represents a source of life and energy. It is also a symbol of wealth and abundance; the sun's rays are a symbol of the steppe's grain which is the basis of abundance and prosperity.

People of different Kazakh tribes had the golden eagle on their flags for centuries. The eagle symbolises the power of the state. For the modern nation of Kazakhstan the eagle is a symbol of independence, freedom and flight to the future.

History

Kazakh Khanate 

The Kazakh Khanate was decentralized state without an agreed upon flag. There is an alleged blue flag with white endless knot and three white 5-pointed stars in the hoist side of the flag.

The depicted flag sometimes is considered to not be connected to Khanate. The ornament shown in the flag isn't observed by any other Turkic countries, moreover it is an endless knot, which takes part in Buddhist and Hinduist cultures, while Kazakhs were mostly Muslims.

Although the ornament is considered to not be Kazakh, it still takes part in Kazakh culture. Some historians say that the ornament could get to Kazakhs by trading with Chinese, Oirats, or Dzungars, since ancient Turks and Chinese maintained close relationships.

Russian Empire 

In 1882, the Kazakh Khanate was disestablished when Russia invaded the Kazakh Steppe. Kazakh lands were divided in provinces and all of them used the flag of Russian Empire.

Central Asian Revolt 

In 1916, Russia required Muslim people of central Asia to join Russian military forces. Russian colonial regime and economic instability lead to the Central Asian Revolt. Amongst Kazakhs, Amangeldy Imanov was leading figure in the revolts. He and his associated used red flag with the yellow text; blue half-moon in the top-left; blue bow, spear and an axe crossed on red background.

The text on the flag is in Arabic script, since Kazakh's writing system was Arabic prior to 1929. The text on the flag says: "Flag of warrior leader, Amangeldy batyr" (Batyr means hero in Kazakh).

Alash Autonomy 
During World War I, Russia was exhausted as it wasn't ready for war. This was the reason for the food shortages, which occurred even in major cities like Petrograd. First revolution, started because of an economic instability led to the Russian ministers in charge of Central Asia to create the Alash party and found their own autonomy on territory of modern Kazakhstan.

Alasb state again lacked one agreed flag, however the Autonomy had their proposed flags. Alikhan Bukeikhanov and Barlybek Syrtanov proposed the flag with green, yellow, red stripes and white crescent with yellow star in top-left. The direction of stripes is not mentioned. Sometimes people use the logo of Kazak, the journal published by members of Alash, as a flag of the Autonomy. This variant of flag depicts a yellow yurt on a white background.

The most commonly used flag of the Alash Autonomy is yellow crescent with star on a red background, however there is no evidence that flag was ever used.

Soviet Kazakhstan 
After the victory of the Bolsheviks in the Russian Civil War, The Soviets consolidated Alash into the newly forming Kazakh Autonomy, resulting in the establishment of the  Kazakh Autonomous Socialist Soviet Republic in 1920. 

The first flag of the Kazakh ASSR consisted of two lines of yellow text in the canton, surrounded with a yellow line, reading "KSSR" (Kazakh SSR), and "R.F." (Russian Federation). 

Kazakhstan was a part of the Russian Federation until the 1937 establishment of the Kazakh Soviet Socialist Republic within the Union, and, subsequently, changed its flag. This flag had the hammer and sickle in the canton and the name of the republic in Kazakh and Russian under it. The Kazakh name was written in Latin, as the writing system of Kazakh changed in 1929 from Arabic to Latin.

The final change of flag of the flag of the Kazakh SSR happened in 1953, as all Soviet republics redesigned their flags. This flag consisted of a hammer and a sickle with a star above it and a light blue horizontal stripe on a red background. The flag was briefly used after Kazakhstan gained its independence in December 1991.

Republic of Kazakhstan 

Unlike other formerly Soviet nations, like Georgia, Belarus or Ukraine, Kazakhstan did not have an official flag before becoming part of the Soviet Union. Kazakhstan kept its Soviet flag up until 4 June 1992.

The Government of Kazakhstan organized a contest on 2 January 1992, which received these proposed flags:

The designer of the current flag, Shaken Niyazbekov, had originally colored the ornament red. This was changed in July 1992 to the current shade of gold.

Variants

Gallery

See also
Emblem of Kazakhstan
Flag of the Kazakh Soviet Socialist Republic
List of Kazakh flags

References

External links

 
 Kazakhstan - Vexillographia

Kazakhstan
National symbols of Kazakhstan
Kazakhstan
 
Kazakhstan
1992 establishments in Kazakhstan